Gold  is the fourth release overall and third extended play by American country music singer Jessie James Decker.  The EP was released on February 17, 2017, through Epic Records. It was preceded in 2015 by the top 40 country single, "Lights Down Low". Gold includes collaborations with Alyssa Bonagura and Maren Morris.

The EP has sold 17,800 copies in the United States as of June 2017.

Track listing

Charts

Singles

References

External links
 

2017 EPs
Jessie James Decker EPs
Epic Records EPs